Cemoro Lawang (also known as Cemorolawang, Cemora Lawang or Cemara Lawang) is a very small hamlet north-east of Mount Bromo (East Java), Indonesia with the altitude of 2,217 meters above sea level. Administratively, this hamlet is a part of Ngadisari Village, Sukapura, Probolinggo Regency. Cemoro Lawang is one of many routes point to Tengger Caldera from Probolinggo route. There is a view point to see Mount Batok and Mount Bromo. It is principally a base for early morning climbs of Mt Bromo, an active volcano which stands in the middle of a Sand Sea. Many visitors approach the mountain from Surabaya which is about three hours drive away; others come from Bali.

Geography

Climate 
Cemoro Lawang's climate is warm and temperate, and is classified as subtropical highland (Cwb) under the Köppen climate classification. The relatively brief wet season (also known as "summer") occurs at December to March, and is known to have lukewarm temperatures, shorter diurnal ranges, and a good deal of rainfall. The dry season stands out for the remainder of the year (June-September), and is best known for its chilly mornings, incidences of frost, and single-digit temperatures. The average temperature here is 13.2 °C, and the average rainfall is 1924 mm.

Gallery

See also
 Mount Bromo
 Bromo Tengger Semeru National Park

References

External links
Bromo Tengger Semeru official website 

Populated places in East Java